A dance belt is a kind of specialized undergarment commonly worn by male ballet dancers to support their genitals. Most are similar in design to thong underwear.

Dance belts were originally developed in the early 1900s for male dancers to wear during training and performances because 
 vigorous choreographic movements subject their external genitalia - when not otherwise supported, restrained and cradled snugly against the lower groin area - to loose, unrestrained instability (i.e. flopping around) due to rapid acceleration, deceleration and gravity forces (because as the body temperature warms up during physical exertion, the scrotal skin naturally loosens, relaxes and droops down in order to moderate the testes at a lower temperature level (or shrinks and contracts when subject to cold to maintain a warmer temperature)); where such floppy movements of the male appendage can be distracting to the dancer.
 skin-tight, body-hugging ballet tights would otherwise reveal the contours of the male dancer's genitalia to a degree of detail considered distracting and immodest to the viewer; male ballet costumes from the lower torso down to the feet evolved from short breeches worn over leggings to just leggings alone.

A dance belt resembles a thong undergarment in design but has a wider waist belt so the flesh at the waist is not pinched in. At the back this waist belt is connected to the bottom of the front triangular panel that covers and supports the male genital parts by a very narrow piece of elasticized fabric. This strip of fabric passes between the wearer's legs and is recessed in the intergluteal cleft, the crevice formed by the two buttocks (also called a "natal cleft" ) and is sometimes referred to as a "T-back" design.

Athletic supporters or jock straps also provide active males with anatomical support but involve a pair of elasticized straps joined to the bottom of the front pouch passing between the legs and encircling the upper thighs just below and on each side of the buttocks. The Japanese fundoshi shares some similarities with a dance belt.

The color of the dancer's supporter is normally chosen to be similar to his skin tone, such as beige, dark brown or black, which is intended to make it less apparent beneath the dancer's thin, tight fitting, base outer apparel, a pair of tights perhaps worn over a type of body suit leotard. Dance belts are also produced in white, which can be dyed to any color.  Some dances are choreographed and performed where the males wear only a dance belt alone.

Lighter coloured tights, such as white, light grey, creme and beige can be more revealing of and make more conspicuous the delta-shaped detail of the male dancer's genital area since the shape and contour of his penis tend to stand out more under bright lights for stage performance, accentuated as they are by shadowy depression and high relief. Darker tights on the other hand tend to be less revealing, especially when they have a flat, matte finish to them rather than a shiny one that catches and reflects the intense, bright stage lights more.

Dance belts are quite comfortable to wear when properly sized, fitted and worn-in.  When properly positioned within the garment, the male anatomical parts are held closely and firmly to the lower abdomen in a raised (pointed upward) attitude rather than in a hanging attitude as for an athletic supporter (although variations are possible for both types of genital support devices). At the same time, the waist belt material stretches, thus allowing for free, unrestricted movements required for dance.

Though dance belts are classically of the T- or thong-back design, there are also designs featuring a full seat similar to brief style underwear. These types are, however, less aesthetically pleasing as they cause panty lines, which refers to the elasticized bottom edge of the seat cloth pressing lightly into the buttock flesh, so as to be noticeable beneath the tights.

The front triangular support pouch can be constructed simply of a couple of layers of spandex fabric (or similar); or else there can also be a thin layer of very light non-bulky padding material incorporated in order to effect an even more smoothed, discreet bulge. Regardless, there is generally no seam down the front of the pouch as there usually is with conventional thong underwear for men, the reason being that such a seam would be visible beneath clinging tights.

Dance belts can be worn by any active males desirous of support and a visually smooth and neat appearance when wearing snug, form fitting and generally stretchy clothing, for example costumes worn in dance styles other than ballet, as well as by figure skaters, trapeze artists, actors (and cosplayers) wearing skintight super hero costumes, and equestrians. This could be for reasons that, similar to ballet dancing, relate to aesthetics (look), comfort, and testicular injury prevention. In the case of the male rider, a painful injury could result when unsupported, low-hanging testicles strike the saddle, for example as the rider raises and lowers his position while posting during a trot.

See also
 Fundoshi
 Jockstrap
 Sports bra

References

External links 
 

Belt
Protective gear
Undergarments